Massachusetts House of Representatives' 6th Hampden district in the United States is one of 160 legislative districts included in the lower house of the Massachusetts General Court. It covers part of Hampden County. Democrat Michael Finn of West Springfield has represented the district since 2011.

Towns represented
The district includes the following localities:
 part of Chicopee
 part of Springfield
 West Springfield

The current district geographic boundary overlaps with that of the Massachusetts Senate's Hampden district.

Former locales
The district previously covered:
 Holyoke, circa 1872 
 Ludlow, circa 1872

Representatives
 Hiram Q. Sanderson, circa 1858 
 Otis A. Seamans, circa 1859 
 William F. Ferry, circa 1888 
 Ethan C. Robinson, circa 1888 
 Arthur E. Marsh, circa 1920 
 Emma E. Brigham 1928-1936
 Michael P. Pessolano, circa 1951 
 Anthony M. Scibelli, circa 1951 
 Garreth J. Lynch, circa 1975 
 Walter A. DeFilippi, 1991-2001 
 Stephen Buoniconti
 James T. Welch
 Michael J. Finn, 2011-current

See also
 List of Massachusetts House of Representatives elections
 Other Hampden County districts of the Massachusetts House of Representatives: 1st, 2nd, 3rd, 4th, 5th, 7th, 8th, 9th, 10th, 11th, 12th
 Hampden County districts of the Massachusett Senate: Berkshire, Hampshire, Franklin, and Hampden; Hampden; 1st Hampden and Hampshire; 2nd Hampden and Hampshire
 List of Massachusetts General Courts
 List of former districts of the Massachusetts House of Representatives

References

External links
 Ballotpedia
  (State House district information based on U.S. Census Bureau's American Community Survey).
 League of Women Voters of Northampton Area

House
Government of Hampden County, Massachusetts